Digrammia gnophosaria, the hollow-spotted angle, is a species of moth of the  family Geometridae. It is found in Illinois, Louisiana, Minnesota, New Jersey, North Carolina, Oklahoma, Texas and Wisconsin.

The larvae feed on Salix species, including Salix babylonica.

References

Moths described in 1857
Macariini